Utility ratemaking is the formal regulatory process in the United States by which public utilities set the prices (more commonly known as "rates") they will charge consumers. Ratemaking, typically carried out through "rate cases" before a public utilities commission, serves as one of the primary instruments of government regulation of public utilities.

Overview 

Historically, many different classes of business have been classified as public utilities, and thus have been legally mandated to go through the ratemaking process in order to determine the allowable service charges for their industry. Although the classification of public utilities has changed over time, typically such businesses must constitute a de facto monopoly (or "natural monopoly") for the services they provide within a particular jurisdiction. Prominent public utilities that must utilize ratemaking to set rates include railroads, natural gas distribution, telecommunications, and electricity generation and distribution.

In the United States, where many industries classified as public utilities are either private businesses or publicly traded corporations, ratemaking is typically carried out through the authority of a state regulatory body, most often a public utilities commission in an administrative law format. At the national level the Federal Energy Regulatory Commission (formerly the Federal Power Commission) also exercises authority over matters of intrastate wholesale sales of electric power.

Ratemaking goals 
Ratemaking has an economic dimension because it attempts to set prices at efficient (nonmonopolistic, competitive) levels. Ratemaking is political because the product is determined to be a social necessity and rates must be fair across different classes of consumers. Additionally, ratemaking can be designated to serve other social purposes. Although it can be said that all regulation is a combination of politics and economics, ratemaking is frequently more technical. Ratemaking has five functions: 
 Capital attraction;
 Reasonable energy pricing;
 Incentive to be efficient;
 Demand control or consumer rationing; and
 Income transfer.

These regulatory goals can conflict. When prices are kept below market, efficiency suffers. When prices exceed the market, prices may not be reasonable. Both events have occurred during the history of utility regulation. The above goals attempt to serve the interests of the utility, its shareholders, consumers, and the general public. To be constitutional, a rate cannot be so high as to be confiscatory. Most state statutes further require rates to be just, reasonable, and non-discriminatory.

Capital attraction 
Although utilities are regulated industries, they are typically privately owned and must therefore attract private capital. Accordingly, because of constitutional takings law, government regulators must assure private companies that a fair revenue is available in order to continue to attract investors and borrow money. This creates competing aims of capital attraction and fair prices for customers. Utility companies are therefore allowed to charge "reasonable rates," which are generally regarded as rates that allow utilities to encourage people to invest in utility stocks and bonds at the same rate of return they would in comparable non-regulated industries.

Reasonable energy pricing 

State laws typically restrict utilities from large, sudden rate increases. Utilities should implement new rates over time so that consumers and business can adapt to the changing prices. This is known as the principle of gradualism.

Demand control or consumer rationing 

The price of a utility's products and services will affect its consumption. As with most demand curves, a price increase decreases demand. Through a concept known as rate design or rate structure, regulators set the prices (known as "rates" in the case of utilities) and thereby affect the consumption. With declining block rates, the per-unit price of utility consumption decreases as the energy consumption increases. Typically a declining block rate is offered only to very large consumers. If conservation is the goal, regulators can promote conservation by letting prices rise. A third possible rate design is a flat rate which charges the same price for all consumption.

Income transfer 
Ratemaking distributes wealth from consumers to utility owners. Ratemaking also involves redistribution of wealth among and within classes of customers. Utility customers are generally grouped in three categories – residential, industrial, and commercial. Each group is sometimes further subdivided.

Executive compensation 
The compensation received by the executive in utility companies often receives the most scrutiny in the review of operating expenses. Just as regulated utilities and their governing bodies struggle to maintain a balance between keeping consumer costs reasonable and being profitable enough to attract investors, they must also compete with private companies for talented executives and then be able to retain those executives.

Constraints from regulation have been shown to affect the level of compensation received by executives in electric utilities. Executive compensation usually consists of four parts: 
 Base salary
 Short term incentive pay (STIP)
 Long-term incentive pay (LTIP); and
 Benefits such as retirement and health care
Regulated companies are less likely to use incentive-based compensation in addition to base salaries. Executives in regulated electric utilities are less likely to be paid for their performance in bonuses or stock options.

Electric utility ratemaking for executives 
Executives in regulated electric utilities also have less managerial control than those in unregulated or private industries. These executives are in charge of large numbers of workers as well as the company's physical and financial assets. Limiting their control has been shown to reduce investment opportunities. The same constraints are placed on the board of directors for the utility by the monitoring or oversight of the utility commission and they are less likely to approve compensation policies that include incentive-based pay. The compensation for electric utility executives will be the lowest in regulated utilities that have an unfavorable regulatory environment. These companies have more political constraints than those in a favorable regulatory environment and are less likely to have a positive response to requests for rate increases.

Just as increased constraints from regulation drive compensation down for executives in electric utilities, deregulation has been shown to increase compensation. The need to encourage risk-taking behavior in seeking new investment opportunities while keeping costs under control requires deregulated companies to offer performance-based incentives to their executives. It has been found that increased compensation is also more likely to attract executives experienced in working in competitive environments.

The Energy Act of 1992 in the United States removed previous barriers to wholesale competition in the electric utility industry. Currently twenty-four states allow for deregulated electric utilities: Ohio, Oklahoma, Oregon, Pennsylvania, Rhode Island, Texas, Virginia, Arizona, Arkansas, California, Connecticut, Delaware, Illinois, Maine, Maryland, Massachusetts, Michigan, Montana, New Hampshire, New Jersey, New Mexico, New York, and Washington D.C. As electric utility monopolies have been increasingly broken up into deregulated businesses, executive compensation has risen; particularly incentive compensation.

Revenue Requirement formula 

The traditional rate formula is intended to produce a utility's revenue requirement:
R = O + (V − D)r
The elements of the traditional rate formula are defined as:
R is the utility's total revenue requirement or rate level. This is the total amount of money a regulator allows a utility to collect from customers.
O is the utility's operating expenses, which are passed through to customers at cost with no mark-up.  Examples include labor (for everything from field repair and maintenance crews to customer service and accounting personnel); bad debt expense; interest on debt; depreciation on assets; and federal (and sometimes state) taxes on income. A large operating expense is often the cost of the commodity itself (electricity, or natural gas, or water) purchased by a utility for its customers' use. 
V is the gross value of the utility's tangible and intangible property.
D is the utility's accrued depreciation. Combined (V − D) constitute the utility's rate base, also known as its capital investment.  Examples include wires, pipes, poles, substations, pumping stations, generating stations, computer software, computer hardware, office furniture, office buildings, etc.  
r is the rate of return a for-profit utility is allowed to earn on its capital investment or on its rate base.  Non-profit utilities, such as those owned by states or municipalities, or those owned by customers in rural areas (common in the United States) do not add an "r" in the Revenue Requirement formula, nor do they incur income tax expenses.

The traditional rate formula encourages capital investment because it provides a rate of return on the rate base. The more a utility invests, the more money it earns.  This is why for-profit utilities prefer capital investment over operating expenses, called "capital bias".

Translation of Revenue Requirements into customer rates 
Once a utility's revenue requirement is established in a quasi-judicial proceeding called a rate case, overseen in most countries by monopoly regulators, the focus turns to translating revenue requirements into customer rates.  Though an oversimplification, most revenue requirements are translated into a rate per unit of commodity used by a customer.  In electric utilities, the unit is typically a kilowatt hour, or "kWh"; for natural gas, the unit is typically ten British Thermal Units, called a dekatherm, or "dkt"; in water utilities, the unit is typically a gallon.  The formula for translating revenue requirements into customer rates (for example, cents per kWh) is Rate per unit = R (revenue requirement) / expected commodity sales in units in the upcoming year.

The logic behind this is simple.  If a utility's revenue requirement is $10 million, and it expects to sell 100 million units, the rate per unit is $0.10 cents/unit.  If the utility actually sells 100 million units at $0.10 cents/unit, it will collect its $10 million revenue requirement.  However, if a utility sells fewer units than expected, it will collect less than its $10 million revenue requirement, and if a utility sells more units than expected, it will collect more than its $10 million revenue requirement.  This is why utilities prefer to sell more units than expected, called "throughput incentive".

Operating expenses 

A firm's operating expenses, such as wages, salaries, supplies, maintenance, taxes, and research and development, must be recouped if the utility is to stay operational. Operating costs are most often the largest component of the revenue requirement, and the easiest to determine. Occasionally, operating expense items have caught the attention of regulatory agencies and courts, and these items have been examined more closely.

Regulators must make two determinations. First, they must determine which items should be allowed as expenses. Second, regulators must determine the value of those expense items. The determination of value has generally been left to the management of the utility under the theory that these are essentially business decisions which will not be second guessed by a regulatory agency or a court. Managerial good faith is presumed. Although both agencies and courts have the legal authority to supervise the utility's management, they will not substitute their judgment unless there is an abuse of managerial discretion. Hence, litigation involving operating expense issues has been light.

Performance-based regulation 

The above-described formula may be used to calculate a firm's allowed revenues (cost-of-service regulation). However, if the rates are set on the basis of a company's own costs, there is no incentive to reduce these costs. Furthermore, regulated utilities may have the incentive to overinvest. The purpose of performance-based regulation is to reduce the negative impact of information asymmetries and to motivate regulated companies to reduce their costs in order to increase profit. Usually, this is done by setting a cap on prices or revenues. A general formula is:

P(t) = (1 + RPI - X) . P(t-1)
where
P(t) is the price in time t.
RPI is the rate of inflation.
X is the efficiency factor (X-factor).
P(t-1) is the price in time (t - 1).

Since the price is set with regard to the overall inflation rate (RPI) and required growth of efficiency (X-factor), such kind of regulation is also called RPI-X regulation.

Notes

References 

 
 

Economics of regulation
Public utilities of the United States